Harry Del Reeks (May 23, 1920 – January 15, 1982) was an American landscape painter and combat artist for the United States Marine Corps.

Early life and work

Harry Reeks was born in Covington, Louisiana. His father, John F. Reeks, was an artist. Harry Reeks would study under his father, a Spanish artist named Jose Mass, and Charles Reinike. As a young artist, he lived in the French Quarter and painted scenes of the nightlife of New Orleans. He relocated to California in 1939.

Military career

Reeks was a combat artist for the United States Marine Corps. He was at the Battle of Iwo Jima, arriving with the invasion force. He was there for 30 days and was injured twice during the battle. Reeks also documented the New Georgia Campaign, the Bougainville Campaign, the Battle of Saipan, and the Battle of Guam. After his service, he returned to California.

After military service

Back in California, Reeks painted the sights and landscapes of San Francisco. He was visiting Hawaii and met Chloe Baker, who was in the United States Marine Corps Reserve. They married in Hawaii and lived in California, followed by Texas. In 1954 they moved to Biloxi, Mississippi. He worked for a public relations firm and did interviews with Elvis Presley. He was a portrait artist for a resort. Reeks also became a realtor and worked in Gulf Hills, Mississippi. Reeks started his own real estate company in 1967. He also worked for Spurgeon Pickering doing land development and was the foreman for the development of Gulf Park Estates, Mississippi.

Legacy

The work of Reeks is held in the collections of the Anne S.K. Brown Military Collection at the John Hay Library at Brown University and the Parris Island Museum. He also became a sculptor, following in the footsteps of his father, who was also  a sculptor. His  sculptures are held in the collection of the Roman Catholic Diocese of Biloxi. Sculptural works include Sam Dale Monument in Daleville, Mississippi and the Golden Fisherman in Biloxi, Mississippi.

References

1920 births
1982 deaths
American real estate brokers
American landscape painters
United States Marines
United States Marine Corps personnel of World War II
People from Covington, Louisiana
People from Biloxi, Mississippi
Battle of Iwo Jima
World War II artists
American war artists
20th-century American sculptors
20th-century American male artists
American male sculptors
20th-century American businesspeople
Sculptors from Mississippi